Dev Entertainment Ventures Pvt Ltd is an Indian movie production and distribution company based in Kolkata. The company was established by Deepak Adhikari and Gurupada Adhikari in 2017. In a short while, the company has grown on to become one of the leading Bengali movie production houses in Eastern India.

History 
Dev Entertainment Ventures Pvt Ltd was founded by Deepak Adhikari, better known in the Bengali film industry as Dev, one of the leading artists of Bengal in 2017, with his father Gurupada Adhikari. Dev started his career as an assistant to Abbas Mastan in Mumbai, after that he came to Kolkata for his debut film Agnishapath in 2004. After few years he shot to fame and commercial success with films like I Love You, Premer Kahini, Mon Mane Na, Challenge etc With the emergence of the new wave in contemporary Bengali cinema, Dev founded his company Dev Entertainment Ventures Pvt Ltd to showcase new concepts and talents not from the same mold of the past. Since then all the films produced under his banner have gone on to be both critical as well commercial success and were termed pathbreaking in the Bengali film fraternity.

Offices 
In West Bengal, Dev Entertainment Ventures has two different offices in Kolkata, Register office and Distribution office.

Films Production

Film Distribution

References

External links 
 Official Website
 On Facebook
 On Twitter

Hindi cinema
Film production companies based in Mumbai
Indian companies established in 2017
Mass media companies established in 2017
Film production companies based in Kolkata
Dev (Bengali actor)
2017 establishments in West Bengal